Rebecca Creskoff (born February 1, 1971) is an American actress.

Career
Creskoff graduated from the University of Pennsylvania before attending New York University, where she received her master of fine arts degree.
She has guest-starred in a number of notable television series, including Law & Order, Law & Order: Special Victims Unit, The West Wing, Mad Men, Desperate Housewives, Hannah Montana, Justified, and Curb Your Enthusiasm. She has had recurring roles in The Practice, Girlfriends, Jonas, Bates Motel, and Hung, becoming a series regular on the show's second season.

Creskoff also co-starred in the sitcoms Greetings from Tucson and Quintuplets, both of which ended after one season.

Personal life
Rebecca Creskoff was born and raised in Philadelphia, Pennsylvania. She is the daughter of Betty Jane Creskoff, a home maker, and Howard Creskoff, a lawyer, and has an older sister. Her father is of Russian Jewish descent and her mother is of mostly English and German ancestry.

In 2012, she married fertility doctor Michael Glassner in two ceremonies—the first at a resort in Tulum, Mexico, and the second at Congregation Rodeph Shalom in Philadelphia. They have two children.

Filmography

References

External links
 

1971 births
20th-century American actresses
21st-century American actresses
Actresses from Philadelphia
American film actresses
American television actresses
Jewish American actresses
Living people
Tisch School of the Arts alumni
University of Pennsylvania alumni
People from Cheltenham, Pennsylvania